Lloyd George Richards  (June 29, 1919 – June 29, 2006) was a Canadian-American theatre director, actor, and dean of the Yale School of Drama from 1979 to 1991, and Yale University professor emeritus.

Biography 
Richards was born in  Toronto, Ontario, but was raised in Detroit, Michigan. His father, a Jamaican carpenter turned auto-industry worker, died when Richards was nine years old. Soon after, his mother lost her eyesight, he and his brother Allan kept the family together. He later went on to study law at Wayne State University where instead he found his way in theatrical arts after a brief break during World War II while serving in the  U.S. Army Air Force.

Among Richards' accomplishments are his staging the original production of Lorraine Hansberry's A Raisin in the Sun, debuting on Broadway to standing ovations on 11 March 1959, and in 1984 he introduced August Wilson to Broadway in Ma Rainey's Black Bottom.

As head of the National Playwrights Conference at the Eugene O'Neill Theater Center, he helped develop the careers of August Wilson, Wendy Wasserstein, Christopher Durang, Lee Blessing and David Henry Hwang.

Richards was Dean of Yale School of Drama and Artistic Director of Yale Repertory Theatre, both in New Haven, Connecticut, from 1979 to 1991; he became Professor Emeritus at Yale School of Drama after his retirement.

Richards died of heart failure on his eighty-seventh birthday in New York City.

Richards also taught Moscow Art Theatre acting technique under Paul Mann at the Actor's Workshop in New York alongside Morris Carnovsky.

Awards and nominations 
Awards
 1987: Drama Desk Award Outstanding New Play - Fences
 1987: Tony Award Best Direction of a Play - Fences
 1987: Tony Award Best Play - Fences
 1987: Golden Plate Award of the American Academy of Achievement
 1990: Drama Desk Award Outstanding New Play - The Piano Lesson
 1991: Regional Theatre Tony Award - Yale Repertory Theatre
 1993: National Medal of Arts
 2002: The Dorothy and Lillian Gish Prize

Nominations
 1960: Tony Award Best Direction of a Play - A Raisin in the Sun
 1981: Tony Award Best Play - A Lesson From Aloes
 1987: Drama Desk Award Outstanding Director of a Play - Fences
 1988: Drama Desk Award Outstanding Director of a Play - Joe Turner's Come and Gone
 1988: Drama Desk Award Outstanding New Play - Joe Turner's Come and Gone
 1988: Tony Award Best Direction of a Play - Joe Turner's Come and Gone
 1988: Tony Award Best Play - A Walk in the Woods
 1988: Tony Award Best Play - Joe Turner's Come and Gone
 1989: Drama Desk Award Outstanding Revival - Long Day's Journey Into Night
 1989: Tony Award Best Revival - Ah, Wilderness!
 1990: Drama Desk Award Outstanding Director of a Play - The Piano Lesson
 1990: Tony Award Best Direction of a Play - The Piano Lesson
 1990: Tony Award Best Play - The Piano Lesson
 1996: Drama Desk Award Outstanding Director of a Play - Seven Guitars
 1996: Tony Award Best Direction of a Play - Seven Guitars

References

External links 
 Lloyd Richards Papers James Weldon Johnson Collection in the Yale Collection of American Literature, Beinecke Rare Book and Manuscript Library.
 
 
 Lloyd Richards' oral history video excerpts at The National Visionary Leadership Project
 Lloyd Richards Biography and Interview on American Academy of Achievement

1919 births
2006 deaths
Male actors from New York City
Male actors from Toronto
American male film actors
United States Army personnel of World War II
American theatre directors
Black Canadian male actors
Canadian people of Jamaican descent
United States Army Air Forces soldiers
Wayne State University alumni
Yale University faculty
20th-century American male actors
Canadian emigrants to the United States